Myrmecoderus is a genus of narrow-waisted bark beetles in the family Salpingidae. There are at least three described species in Myrmecoderus.

Species
These three species belong to the genus Myrmecoderus:
 Myrmecoderus dominicensis (Horn, 1876)
 Myrmecoderus laevipennis (Horn, 1893)
 Myrmecoderus rileyi Aalbu, Andrews & Pollock, 2005

References

Further reading

 
 

Salpingidae
Articles created by Qbugbot